Janice Lincoln (also known as the Beetle, or otherwise Lady Beetle) is a supervillainess appearing in American comic books published by Marvel Comics. She is the sixth character to assume the Beetle alias, and the daughter of Tombstone.

Janice Lincoln made her live-action debut in the Marvel Cinematic Universe film Spider-Man: Far From Home (2019), played by Claire Rushbrook.

Publication history

Janice Lincoln first appeared as the new Beetle in Captain America #607 (Aug. 2010), and was created by writer Ed Brubaker and artist Jackson "Butch" Guice.

Beetle features as one of the main characters in Superior Foes of Spider-Man where her real name is revealed.

Fictional character biography

Janice Lincoln is the daughter of the supervillain Tombstone. Her mother was an ex-girlfriend of Tombstone during his early days in organized crime. Janice grew up with her father showing up sporadically, usually to help out with bills and schooling. Janice idolized her father and his criminal activities, however, she was forbidden to take part in them.

After building a successful career as a defense attorney, she was appointed to defend Baron Zemo, at which point she volunteered to work for him as the new Beetle. Janice's armor is also revealed to have been built by the Fixer. Helmut Zemo and the Fixer provided Janice with the Beetle armor and a nano-virus as part of their plan to destroy the new Captain America. She emerges from the rubble of an explosion she causes to confront Captain America (Bucky) and Black Widow. The new Beetle fights Bucky and Black Widow in a short battle and is defeated. Bucky unmasks her, and realizes she is culpable in using the nano-virus on him. She is imprisoned in The Raft, where she reveals that she knows Captain America and Bucky are one and the same. While Janice resists Bucky and the Widow's attempts to interrogate her for the identity of her employer, the Fixer asks Zemo whether they should punish her for her failure. Zemo is merciful, saying that she knows no information that would hurt them. Janice is left to her own devices, and the heroes still manage to piece together Zemo's identity. However, Zemo still exposes Captain America's true identity to the general public.

As part of the Marvel NOW! event, she is now a member of Boomerang's Sinister Six. After being defeated by Superior Spider-Man (Otto Octavius's mind in Peter Parker's body), Boomerang is secretly contracted by the Chameleon to recover the head of former Maggia leader Silvermane from the Owl. To this end, Boomerang deceives the team into agreeing to help him. However, after the original Beetle, the reformed Abe Jenkins, is assigned to be Boomerang's parole officer, the team vote him out and Janice as their new team leader. Speed Demon's vote is motivated by his unrequited attraction for her. The others note that the Beetle becomes more despotic as team leader, but attribute this as a reaction to the pressure to succeed and avoid incarceration. Boomerang secretly notifies Power Man and Iron Fist of the Sinister Six's whereabouts. Janice and her associates are arrested, but Boomerang frees them in transit to jail and decides to reclaim his leadership role. In this appearance, her first name is revealed to be Janice.

After assaulting the Owl's base the Beetle, Overdrive and Speed Demon were captured by the villain and interrogated. The Beetle tried to blackmail the Owl into releasing them while covertly dialing for back-up. Unimpressed, the Owl got ready to execute her when reinforcements arrived in the form of Tombstone, where it is later revealed that she is his daughter.

Janice appears at Stark Industries after the events of The Superior Foes of Spider-Man, claiming to have reformed, and applying for the open Head of Security position alongside Prodigy, Victor Mancha, and Scott Lang. After seducing Iron Man, Janice tries to assassinate him at the behest of an unidentified client, but she is disarmed by Lang, and pursued and presumably apprehended by Iron Man.

During the "Last Days" part of the Secret Wars storyline, Janice appears in Miami where she and a despondent Lang have a drunken tryst as the world is destroyed by the final Incursions between Earth-616 and Earth-1610.

Janice Lincoln appeared in the courthouse as a lawyer representing Mysterio following his failed alien invasion plot.

In a prelude to the "Hunted" storyline, Beetle is among the animal-themed characters captured by Taskmaster and Black Ant for Kraven the Hunter's upcoming Great Hunt. When she tries to flee the Hunter-Bots, Beetle hits the forcefield surrounding Central Park.

Janice Lincoln meets the Francine Frye version of Electro where she states that she is offering her membership. Janice learned how Francine got her powers as Janice tells her that she is Tombstone's daughter. Janice states that they are building an organization that values and respects the female contributions to the side of evil. Outside of the mentor-ship programs, salons, and a child care facility, Janice states that they had a teleconference Black Mariah from prison and are trying to make contact with Morgan le Fay. Janice then proceeds to introduce Francine to the rest of the team consisting of Lady Octopus, Scorpia, Trapstr (who is deciding if she will replace the E with an A), and White Rabbit. Francine was reluctant to join up with them until Janice states that their first mission has them targeting Boomerang. The Sinister Syndicate begins their mission where they attack the F.E.A.S.T. building that Boomerang is volunteering at. Boomerang tries to reason with Beetle and Electro who are still made at him for betraying him. Beetle states that they aren't targeting F.E.A.S.T., they are targeting him. Beetle leads the Sinister Syndicate in attacking Boomerang. After getting Aunt May to safety, Peter Parker changes into Spider-Man and helps Boomerang fight the Syndicate. The Syndicate starts doing their formation attack until Spider-Man accidentally sets off Boomerang's gaserang which knocks out Spider-Man enough for the Syndicate to make off with Boomerang. As Beetle has Electro write a proposal on how the Syndicate can use Boomerang as an example to the criminal underworld, Beetle leaves while calling Wilson Fisk that they caught Boomerang as she is given the information on where the exchange can happen. Spider-Man goes to visit Randy Robertson and finds him making out with Beetle. As Spider-Man secretly watches them, Randy learns that Janice's Syndicate kidnapped Boomerang and what had transpired at the F.E.A.S.T. building. He tells Janice that she needs to let Boomerang go. Beetle leaves stating that he would not use her disintegrator ray on him because she is nice to Randy. As she flies, Beetle contacts Mayor Wilson Fisk stating that she is sending him the coordinates to Boomerang's location. When Beetle meets up with the Syndicate, they hear Mayor Fisk outside stating that they are harboring a criminal and are to surrender Boomerang to him or suffer the full might of New York City. After reading the paper in Boomerang's hand that belonged to Mayor Fisk, Beetle tells the Syndicate that they should let Boomerang go. While Beetle claimed that she betrayed them, she did it because she's a supervillain and states that she plans to have Kingpin deputize them. The rest of the Syndicate is not up with this plan. Trapstr later stated that she learned about Beetle's boyfriend by hacking her e-mails. The Syndicate then assists Spider-Man against Mayor Fisk's forces. Beetle has Spider-Man evacuate Boomerang while the Syndicate fights Mayor Fisk's forces while not killing them. The Syndicate is defeated and arrested by the police. Their transport is then attacked by an unknown assailant who frees them. At the F.E.A.S.T. building where men working for Mr. Stone are helping to rebuild the building, Aunt May mentioned to Randy Robertson that a high-powered lawyer got Councilman Galazkiewicz to expedite a permit request in exchange for not suing the city on F.E.A.S.T.'s behalf. Randy learns that the lawyer is Janice who invites them to brunch this weekend. Beetle is briefly seen on the nearby rooftop as Randy sees her while accepting the brunch invite.

Powers and abilities
The Beetle suit grants superhuman strength and durability, allows the wearer to fly and stick to walls. Janice's armor seems to be loosely based on the armor designed by the Tinkerer for Abe Jenkins after his original Beetle armor was destroyed by Iron Man. However, the Zemo/Fixer costume does not seem to have the electro-byte offensive capability or the internal battle computer of Jenkins' suit. In her initial appearance, she uses military-grade weaponry to ambush Bucky and the Black Widow.

Reception

Critical reception 
Brandon Zachary of CBR.com referred to Janice Lincoln as one of the "best new Spider-Man villains of the 21st century," asserting, "A surprisingly pragmatic but ambitious character, Beetle is the most charming new Spider-Man villain in years."

Accolades 

 In 2014, WhatCulture ranked Janice Lincoln 4th in their "7 Unused Spider-Man Villains Who'd Be Great In The Marvel Cinematic Universe" list.
 In 2020, CBR.com ranked Janice Lincoln 2nd in their "Marvel: 10 Famous Villains From The 2000s To Bring Back" list, 7th in their "10 Most Powerful Members of the Sinister Syndicate" list, and included her in their "Spider-Man: The Best New Villains of the Century" list.
 In 2021, Screen Rant included Janice Lincoln in their "Spider-Man: 10 Best Female Villains" list and in their "10 Best Marvel Legacy Villains Who Lived Up To Their Predecessor" list.
 In 2021, CBR.com ranked Janice Lincoln 1st in their "Marvel: 10 Characters Baron Zemo Created In The Comics" list.
 In 2022, Screen Rant included Janice Lincoln in their "10 Most Powerful Lawyers In Comics" list.
 In 2022, CBR.com ranked Janice Lincoln 8th in their "10 Most Powerful Lawyers In Marvel Comics" list.

In other media

 Janice Lincoln appears in the Marvel Cinematic Universe film Spider-Man: Far From Home, portrayed by Claire Rushbrook. This version is a former employee of Stark Industries and a member of Mysterio's group, helping with his plan to fraudulently establish him as an Avengers-level hero from another world. As his costume designer, she designed Mysterio's suit and handles costume fittings.
 Janice Lincoln / Beetle appears as a boss in Marvel: Avengers Alliance.

References

External links
 Janice Lincoln at Marvel Wikia

Characters created by Ed Brubaker
Comics characters introduced in 2010
Spider-Man characters
Fictional mercenaries in comics
Marvel Comics female supervillains
Fictional American lawyers
Fictional defense attorneys
Marvel Comics female superheroes
Film supervillains